Santiago-Pontones is a city located in the province of Jaén, Spain. According to the 2005 census (INE), the city has a population of 4131 inhabitants.

References

Municipalities in the Province of Jaén (Spain)